Keturi vėjai (The Four Winds) was a Lithuanian literary movement and literary magazine, active from 1924 to 1928.

The Keturi vėjai movement began with the publication of The Prophet of the Four Winds by Kazys Binkis (1893–1942). The theoretical basis of Keturi vėjai initially was futurism which arrived through Russia from the West, and it later was influenced by cubism, dadaism, surrealism, unanimism, and German expressionism. The most influential futurist for Lithuanian writers was Russian poet Vladimir Mayakovsky. Members of Keturi vėjai included founder Kazys Binkis, Antanas Rimydis (b. 1905), Juozas Tysliava (b. 1902), Salys Šemerys (b. 1898), Juozas Žengė (b. 1899), and Teofilis Tilvytis (b. 1903).

Poet Adomas Jakštas was a fierce critic of the Keturi vėjai movement. He objected to its literary principles, aesthetics, and philosophy. The only poet of that generation not attracted to Keturi vėjai was Stasys Santvaras, who was more interested in symbolism and expressionism than in modern forms of poetry.

The poetry of dadaist Pranas Morkūnas (1900–1941) has been characterized as a continuation of rebellion started by Keturi vėjai against traditional poetry.

The Lithuanian school Keturi vėjai in Dublin, Ireland is named after the literary movement.

References

1924 establishments in Lithuania
Defunct literary magazines published in Europe
Defunct magazines published in Lithuania
Lithuanian literature
Lithuanian-language magazines
Magazines established in 1924
Magazines disestablished in 1928